Chrysaethe amboroensis is a species of beetle in the family Cerambycidae. It was described by Clarke in 2010.

References

amboroensis
Beetles described in 2010